The 2016 Gran Premio Bruno Beghelli was the 21st edition of the Gran Premio Bruno Beghelli road cycling one day race. It was held on 25 September 2016 as part of UCI Europe Tour in category 1.HC.

Teams
Twenty-five teams of up to eight riders started the race:

Result

References

2016 UCI Europe Tour
2016 in Italian sport
Gran Premio Bruno Beghelli